So Good to See You may refer to:

"So Good to See You", a song by Cheap Trick from the album In Color
"So Good to See You", a song by Shawn Colvin from the album These Four Walls